S. Gurusamy is an Indian politician and incumbent Member of the Legislative Assembly of Tamil Nadu. He was elected to the Tamil Nadu legislative assembly as a Dravida Munnetra Kazhagam candidate from Anthiyur constituency in 2006 election.

References 

Dravida Munnetra Kazhagam politicians
Living people
Year of birth missing (living people)